Fly High Little Butterfly is a 1979 single by the European disco group Arabesque. The song, like previous singles failed to chart in Germany, but became a huge success in Japan. Heike Rimbeau sang the lead, accompanied by Karen Ann Tepperis and Michaela Rose as backing singers. The song tells the story of a "little butterfly" who has a passion for singing and dancing from a very young age, and strives to be like her mother. The butterfly eventually reaches her goal.

The song was exclusively released as a single in Japan, where it stalled at #33 on the Oricon Singles charts for three weeks.

Track listing
 A. "Fly High Little Butterfly" - 3:26
 B. "Give It Up" - 3:57

References

1979 songs
1979 singles
Arabesque (group) songs
Number-one singles in Japan
Victor Records singles